Jamaica competed at the 1984 Summer Olympics (for the tenth time) in Los Angeles, United States. 45 competitors, 31 men and 14 women, took part in 35 events in 5 sports.

Medalists

Athletics

Men's 400 metres 
Bertland Cameron  
 Heat — 46.14
 Quarterfinals — 45.15
 Semifinals — 45.10 (→ advanced to final did not run due to injury)

Devon Morris  
 Heat — 45.80
 Quarterfinals — 46.14 (→ did not advance)

Mark Senior   
 Heat — 46.73
 Quarterfinals — 46.50 (→ did not advance)

Men's Marathon
 Derick Adamson — 2:25:02 (→ 52nd place)

Men's High Jump
 Desmond Morris
 Qualification — 2.15m (→ did not advance)

Women's 400m Hurdles 
 Sandra Farmer
 Heat — 57.06 
 Semifinal — 56.05
 Final — 57.15 (→ 8th place)

 Averill Dwyer-Brown 
 Heat — 58.42 (→ did not advance)

Women's Long Jump
Dorothy Scott
 Qualification — 6.47 m 
 Final — 6.40 m (→ 10th place)

Women's Discus Throw 
 Marlene Lewis 
 Qualification — 49.00m (→ did not advance)

Boxing

Cycling

Five cyclists represented Jamaica in 1984.

Individual road race
 Arthur Tenn
 Lorenzo Murdock

Sprint
 Ian Stanley

1000m time trial
 David Weller

Points race
 Peter Aldridge
 Ian Stanley

Swimming

Men's 100m Freestyle 
Deryck Marks
 Heat — 54.63 (→ did not advance, 45th place)

Gordon Scarlett
 Heat — 55.34 (→ did not advance, 52nd place)

Men's 100m Backstroke 
Allan Marsh
 Heat — 1:00.04 (→ did not advance, 27th place)

Men's 200m Backstroke 
Allan Marsh
 Heat — 2:11.57 (→ did not advance, 27th place)

Men's 100m Butterfly
Allan Marsh
 Heat — 57.69 (→ did not advance, 33rd place)

Deryck Marks
 Heat — 1:00.57 (→ did not advance, 41st place)

Men's 200m Individual Medley
Andrew Phillips
 Heat — 2:06.43
 Final — 2:05.60 (→ 6th place)

Men's 400m Individual Medley
Andrew Phillips
 Heat — 4:29.43
 B-Final — 4:27.98 (→ 10th place)

Men's 4 × 100 m Freestyle Relay 
Andrew Phillips, Deryck Marks, Allan Marsh, and Gordon Scarlett
 Heat — 3:34.87 (→ did not advance, 18th place)

Men's 4 × 100 m Medley Relay
Allan Marsh, Andrew Phillips, Deryck Marks, and Gordon Scarlett
 Heat — 4:05.35 (→ did not advance, 17th place)

Weightlifting

References

External links
Official Olympic Reports
International Olympic Committee results database

Nations at the 1984 Summer Olympics
1984
Olympics